Kristoffer Rein (18 February 1912 – 18 July 1993) was a Norwegian politician for the Christian Democratic Party.

He was elected to the Norwegian Parliament from Sør-Trøndelag in 1961, and was re-elected on two occasions. He had previously been a deputy representative from 1958–1961.

Rein was born in Stadsbygd and deputy mayor of Stadsbygd municipality during the term 1947–1951, and mayor in the periods 1955–1959 and 1959–1962.

References

1912 births
1993 deaths
Christian Democratic Party (Norway) politicians
Members of the Storting
20th-century Norwegian politicians